Al Pitrelli is an American guitarist, best known for his work with the Trans-Siberian Orchestra, Megadeth, Alice Cooper, Joe Lynn Turner, Asia and Savatage.

Career

Early career (1982–1995) 
Pitrelli attended the Berklee College of Music in Boston in the early 1980s (where keyboardist Derek Sherinian was his dorm roommate; they would later work together in the Alice Cooper band). While at Berklee, Pitrelli formed an original 1980s metal band with classmates that included Venom guitarist Mike Hickey. After dropping out of Berklee, Pitrelli worked as a session musician and taught guitar lessons in Manhattan and in Bellmore, Long Island. His first major label gig was performing with Michael Bolton, helping him support his single "Fool's Game". Pitrelli said of the single, "This was when Michael Bolton was still trying to be Sammy Hagar and not Engelbert Humperdinck."

In 1989, Pitrelli featured as second guitar on the song "Uptown" on bassist Randy Coven's first album "Funk Me Tender". He then joined forces with Coven and drummer John O'Reilly as a formal member of the Randy Coven Band to release "Sammy Says Ouch!". This lineup would also release an album under a different band name of Coven, Pitrelli, and Reilly (CPR). The album was simply titled "CPR" after the band. Pitrelli was Alice Cooper's guitarist and musical director from 1989 until 1991 on the Trashes The World tour. He then joined Dee Snider's band Widowmaker for two albums in the early/mid–1990s, and also briefly played with Stephen Pearcy (from the band Ratt) in a band called Vertex. Pitrelli also joined Asia, appearing on their albums Aqua (1992) and Aria (1994). He would go on to be featured on many New York sessions, including for Kathy Troccoli, Taylor Dayne, Randy Coven and Exposé. His songs have been covered by Y&T, Lita Ford and Derek Sherinian. For a month he substituted in Blue Öyster Cult.

Savatage (1995–2000) 
Al joined Savatage in 1995, joining at the same time as Chris Caffery returned to the band; Caffery had previously been part of the band around the release of Gutter Ballet in 1989. Pitrelli played guitar on the albums Dead Winter Dead (1995) and The Wake of Magellan (1997), and performed some lead guitar work on Poets and Madmen (2001), despite being a member of Megadeth at the time. On that album, Pitrelli was responsible for the outro of "Stay with Me a While", the main solos of "Morphine Child" and "The Rumor", the first part of the main solo in "Commissar" and its outro. During his time with Savatage, he was asked by their producer Paul O'Neill if he was interested in joining his side project, the Trans-Siberian Orchestra. Pitrelli agreed and has played a role in all of their albums to date.

Trans Siberian Orchestra (1995–present) 
Pitrelli has been a core member of the group since their first album. As well as being the main lead guitarist, he is also the live musical director. TSO's 2007 tour program credits his "edgy playing and vast musical lexicon" with making him a perfect fit for the band's constant boundary-pushing progressive rock stylings. Pitrelli's leads are notable on "Tracers" and the instrumental "Toccata – Carpimus Noctem", the latter being a piece he co-wrote. Both songs form part of the group's fifth rock opera, on their 2009 album Night Castle.

Megadeth (2000–2002) 
Pitrelli was a member of Megadeth from 2000 to 2002, replacing Marty Friedman. Megadeth bandleader Dave Mustaine asked him to join after hearing good reviews from their then-current drummer Jimmy DeGrasso, with whom Pitrelli played during his days with Alice Cooper in the early 1990s. Pitrelli joined the band after an impromptu "audition" in front of a live crowd in Vancouver on January 16, 2000. Two nights after Friedman played his last show with Megadeth, Pitrelli was asked to play fifteen minutes before the show and was shocked by the prospect as they never rehearsed. He was present during the recording of Rude Awakening, a live CD/DVD that was released in 2002. Pitrelli performed on their 2001 album The World Needs a Hero, which has the song "Promises" which was co-written by Pitrelli and he played most of the guitar solos. When Megadeth entered hiatus after Mustaine injured his arm, Pitrelli rejoined Savatage on April 9, 2002, but did not tour with the band. He also continued his work with TSO, which he's still a member of today.

Recent work (2002–present) 

In 1998, Pitrelli was featured on the video game album Sonic Adventure Remix, where he played guitar on a remix of the game's theme song "Open Your Heart".

Personal life 
Al Pitrelli is currently married to Nicole Pitrelli, with whom he has two children: Olivia and Layla. Al also has three sons Jesse, who is currently serving in the US Coast Guard  Jamie, who is a Brooklyn based bass player and Zachary who is serving in the US Navy.

Discography 
Danger Danger 
 Rare Cuts (2003)

Hotshot 
 The Bomb (2005)

Alice Cooper 
 Alice Cooper Trashes The World (DVD, 1990)
 Classicks (1995)

Asia 
 Aqua (1992)
 Aria (1994)

Place Called Rage 
 Place Called Rage (1995)

Randy Coven 
 Funk Me Tender (1989)
 Sammy Says Ouch! (1990)

Coven, Pitrelli, O'Reilly (CPR) 
 CPR (1992)

Megadeth 
 Capitol Punishment: The Megadeth Years (2000)
 The World Needs a Hero (2001)
 Behind the Music (DVD, 2001)
 Rude Awakening (2002)
 Still Alive... and Well? (2002)
 Greatest Hits: Back to the Start (2005)
 Anthology: Set the World Afire (2008)

Morning Wood 
 Morning Wood (1994)

O'2L 
 O'2L
 Doyle's Brunch
 Eat a Pickle

Savatage 
 Dead Winter Dead (1995)
 The Wake of Magellan (1998)
 Poets and Madmen (2001)

Trans-Siberian Orchestra 
 Christmas Eve and Other Stories (1996)
 The Christmas Attic (1998)
 The Ghosts of Christmas Eve (DVD, 2000)
 Beethoven's Last Night (2000)
 The Lost Christmas Eve (2004)
 Different Wings (2004)
 Night Castle (2009)
 Letters From The Labyrinth (2015)

Widowmaker 
 Blood and Bullets (1992)
 Stand by for Pain (1994)

Vertex 
 Vertex (1996)

Guitar Battle 
 Guitar Battle (1998)

References

External links 

 Interview with Al Pitrelli on metal4bremen.de (German / English)
 Interview with TSO's Music Director Al Pitrelli on melodic.net November 2020 (English)

Berklee College of Music alumni
Danger Danger members
American heavy metal guitarists
Living people
Savatage members
Megadeth members
American people of Italian descent
Trans-Siberian Orchestra members
Alice Cooper (band) members
Asia (band) members
American male guitarists
Place of birth missing (living people)
20th-century American guitarists
Year of birth missing (living people)